Agni Sakshi is a 1982 Indian Tamil-language psychological drama film directed by K. Balachander, starring Sivakumar and Saritha. It revolves around a woman with schizophrenia who has difficulty differentiating fiction from reality.

Agni Sakshi was released on 14 November 1982, and failed commercially. However, Saritha won the Tamil Nadu State Film Award for Best Actress.

Plot 

Kannama is an innocent and brilliant woman with classical music and tamil literacy knowledge as she loves Bharathiyar Poems. She was suffering from obsessional psychosis, which makes her aggressive whenever she encounter any Woman and Child abusive around her and Something disturbs her from her childhood which makes her to react abnormal, due to this condition many Groom family have rejected her for Marriage. Aravindan runs a dance school and famous among his field. In dance class, one of the student Anandhi(Swapna) is in love with her master Aravindan - which he doesn't reciprocate. On one of the Aravindan's show Kannama is impressed with his ideology and Performance, she confess her fangirl moment to Aravindan which also makes him feel good about Kannama. Kannama frequently share her poem to Aravindan through letters, impressed by her writing and literacy - he too write reply letters. Later they eventually fall in love and Aravindan decide to move this relationship by his marriage proposal to Kannama's parents. Kannama's parents apparently hide her abnormal behavior to Aravindan and happily accept the proposal. On the other hand Aravindan's parents are from wealthy family initially hesitate to accept it but later for Aravindan's concern they accept Kannama as their Daughter in law.

After some frequent incidents Aravindan's mother Sivakami doesn't like Kannama for her abnormal behavior and later asks for apology. Aravindan frustrated by both his mother and Kannama's behavior. To end this Aravindan takes Kannama to a Psychiatrist, Kannam doesn't aware of this. The Psychiatrist befriends with her and observe her behavior closely and ask Aravindan to not worry about his wife's condition. But due to her continuous obsession Aravindan inquired about her with her parent which they confess her suffering for obsessional psychosis from before marriage itself. After knowing this heartbroken Aravindan leave Kannama at her home and arrange divorce along with his parents. Unaware of what is going on, Kannama confess her pregnancy confirmation to Aravindan who came to have signature for their divorce. Knowing about the Pregnancy he decide cancel the divorce and to live his whole life for Kannama and for their baby to be.

But disturbed Kannama always feel like killing her own baby and diliked to give birth by saying " if this baby is born it will also face the dirty society  and may suffer male chauvinism which drastically happening in this society". By Psychiatrist concern Aravindan takes Kannama to a vacation for mind diversion, while their hotel check-in - one of the guest woman comes to Kannama and tells her that she is her old school friend almost a decade they are meeting now and address her as Thilagam, looking her Kannama frightened and ignored her.

Confused Aravindan, meet Thilagam in her room and ask her about Kannama and why she is frighten to see her. In flashback during Thilagam and Kannama's childhood, Kannama always encounter Thilagam's drunken father's abusive behavior towards his wife. He also beat his wife assuming she might have affair with someone. when Thilagam's mother was pregnant with second child, her father accused her that the child is not belongs to him and abused her continuously. After the delivery of the baby, Thilagam father beats his wife and kills the new born baby by throwing towards the running train, which was witnessed by Kannama and Thilagam. Kannama was mentally affected very badly after this incident. Knowing all this flashback Aravindan informs Psychiatrist about it, Psychiatrist suggest him to say Kannama that - the baby one who lost in front of Kannama is the one blooming in her womb for her rebirth so kannama have drop her idea of killing her baby and take responsible of her god's given child.

After listening to Aravindan words she completely take care of her baby and excited for her child's delivery. On her delivery she gets her husband Aravindan's signature on her hand and gets his blessing.

During the day of delivery Aravindan who is getting ready to visit the Hospital is end up with the death news of Kannama from the Hospital in a call.
He couldn't get rid of his memories of Kannama and try to live for his child.

Cast 
Sivakumar as Aravindhan
Saritha as Kannamma
Swapna as Anandhi
Poornam Viswanathan
Charuhasan as the psychologist
I. S. Ramachandran as the road cleaner
K. S. Jayalakshmi
 Sivakami as Aravindhan's mother

Guest appearances
Rajinikanth as himself
Kamal Haasan as himself
Latha Rajinikanth as herself
Seema as herself

Production 
The script of Agni Sakshi was originally planned with Kamal Haasan but later changed into female oriented, with Sivakumar and Saritha cast.

Soundtrack 
The music was composed by M. S. Viswanathan, with lyrics by Vaali.

Release and reception 
Agni Sakshi was released on 14 November 1982, and failed commercially. However, Saritha won the Tamil Nadu State Film Award for Best Actress.

References

External links 

1980s psychological drama films
1980s Tamil-language films
1982 films
Fictional portrayals of schizophrenia
Films directed by K. Balachander
Films with screenplays by K. Balachander
Indian psychological drama films